The Men's 73 kg competition in judo at the 2020 Summer Olympics in Tokyo was held on 26 July 2021 at the Nippon Budokan.

Results

Finals

Repechage

Pool A

Pool B

Pool C

Pool D

Politically motivated withdrawal

References

External links
 
 Draw (archived)

M73
Judo at the Summer Olympics Men's Lightweight
Men's events at the 2020 Summer Olympics